Leo Hope-Ede is a former association football player who represented New Zealand at international level.

Hope-Ede made his full All Whites debut in a 0–2 loss to New Caledonia on 19 September 1952 and ended his international playing career with eight A-international caps to his credit, scoring one goal. His final cap was an appearance in a 5–3 win over Tahiti on 28 September 1952.

References 

Year of birth missing (living people)
Living people
New Zealand association footballers
New Zealand international footballers
Association football outside forwards